The Commission on Appointments (abbreviated as CA) is a constitutional body which confirms or rejects certain political appointments made by the President of the Philippines. The current commission was created by the 1987 Constitution.

While often associated with the Congress of the Philippines, which consists of the House of Representatives and the Senate, and mistakenly referred to as a congressional committee, the Commission on Appointments is an independent body from the legislature, though its membership is confined to members of Congress.

Background
The Commission on Appointments confirms certain appointments made by the President of the Philippines. Article VII, Section 16 of the 1987 Constitution reads:
"The President shall nominate and, with the consent of the Commission on Appointments, appoint the heads of the executive departments, ambassadors, other public ministers and consuls, or officers of the armed forces from the rank of colonel or naval captain, and other officers whose appointments are vested in him in this Constitution. He shall also appoint all other officers of the Government whose appointments are not otherwise provided for by law, and those whom he may be authorized by law to appoint. The Congress may, by law, vest the appointment of other officers lower in rank in the President alone, in the courts, or in the heads of departments, agencies, commissions, or boards.

The Vice President is exempted from a confirmation hearing to any cabinet position. The nomination of a person to the vice presidency due to a vacancy is handled by both houses of Congress, voting separately.

During the operation of the Jones Law, the Senate confirmed the Governor-General's appointments. During the operation of the 1935 Constitution, the commission was composed of 21 members of the National Assembly of the Philippines. With the restoration of the bicameral Congress in 1940, the commission was composed of 12 senators and 12 representatives with the Senate President as the ex officio chairman. During the operation of the 1973 Constitution, the president appointed at will and without "checks and balances" from the then-parliament. The current constitution, which was ratified in 1987, brought back the 25-member commission.

Officials confirmed
Heads of Executive Departments
Ambassadors, other Public Ministers and Consuls
Officers of the Armed Forces from the rank of Colonel or Naval Captain
Regular Members of the Judicial and Bar Council
Chairman and Commissioners of the Civil Service Commission
Chairman and Commissioners of the Commission on Elections
Chairman and Commissioners of the Commission on Audit
Members of the Regional and Consultative Commissions

The appointments of all judges and the Ombudsman need not be confirmed by the Commission on Appointments. Instead, they are recommended by the Judicial and Bar Council in a short list, from which the President shall then choose from.

Prior to the institutionalization of the party-list system, the president appointed the sectoral representatives. Congress then decided to have these confirmed via the commission, as well.

Under the 1935 Constitution 

 Heads of the executive departments and bureaus
 Officers of the Army from the rank of colonel, of the Navy and air forces from the rank of captain or commander
 All other officers of the Government whose appointments are not herein otherwise provided for, and those whom he may be authorized by law to appoint
 Ambassadors, other public ministers, and consuls
 Members of the Supreme Court and all judges of inferior courts
 The Resident Commissioner of the Philippines (until 1946)

Composition
The commission is composed of the Senate President, the ex officio chairman, twelve senators, and twelve members of the House of Representatives. Members from each house of Congress are elected based on proportional representation from the political parties and parties or organizations registered under the party-list system represented. The Chairman of the Commission shall vote only in case of a tie. It shall act on all appointments submitted within thirty session days of Congress. It shall be governed by a majority vote of all members.

Procedure
A president can either make a nomination or an appointment. Either action involves the commission.

Most presidential actions are ad interim appointments, done when Congress is not in session. In these cases, the appointment allows the official to discharge the duties related to the office immediately. The ad interim appointment ceases to be valid if the commission explicitly rejects the appointment, or if the commission "bypasses" the appointment. If the commission rejects the appointment, the official is no longer allowed to discharge the duties related to his or her office, and the president has to appoint someone else. If the commission bypasses the official, the president can re-appoint that person.

The president can also nominate an official if Congress is in session. In a "regular" nomination, the official can only discharge the duties once the commission consents to the appointment.

Just as other legislative bodies, the commission is divided into different committees. Each appointment is coursed through the committee concerned. After hearings are held, the committee decides to confirm or reject the appointment; the commission en banc then deliberates on whether to accept the committee's decision.

Meeting place
The commission meets at the GSIS Building in Pasay, the seat of the Senate.

Current membership 
These are the members for the 19th Congress of the Philippines:

 Chairman: Juan Miguel Zubiri (ex officio as Senate president)
 Vice Chairman: Ramon Juico Jr.
 Majority Floor Leader: Luis Raymond Villafuerte
 Assistant Majority Floor Leader: Rodante Marcoleta
 Minority Floor Leader: Alan Peter Cayetano
 Assistant Minority Floor Leaders:
 Jose Gay Padiernos
 Johnny Pimentel
 Secretary: Myra Marie Villarica
 Sergeant-at-Arms: Nicasio Javier Radovan Jr.

Rejection of appointment 
Rejection by the commission of the president's appointment is very rare. Usually, due to the padrino system of patronage politics, the president's party controls a supermajority of votes in the House of Representatives, thus mirroring its composition of the commission. This means appointments are almost always are approved, although some are not without difficulty.

During the presidency of Rodrigo Duterte, six of his appointments were rejected. These are:
 Perfecto Yasay, for Secretary of Foreign Affairs
 Gina Lopez, for Secretary of Environment and Natural Resources
 Judy Taguiwalo, for Secretary of Social Welfare and Development
 Rafael V. Mariano, for Secretary of Agrarian Reform
 Paulyn Ubial, for Secretary of Health
Michael Peloton, for Commission on Elections commissioner

Other administrations also had a few of its appointments rejected. These were:
 Ricardo Saludo, for chairman of the Civil Service Commission in 2009 by Gloria Macapagal Arroyo
 Ramon del Rosario, for Secretary of Finance in 1993 by Fidel V. Ramos

See also 
Appointments Clause, clause in the United States Constitution where the commission is based from.

References

External links

Congress of the Philippines
1935 establishments in the Philippines
1987 establishments in the Philippines
Appointments